Tim Douwsma  (born 4 November 1987) is a Dutch singer. In 2007, he participated in the talent show So You Wanna Be a Popstar on Dutch television channel SBS 6.

Career
Douwsma was born in Drachten, Friesland, Netherlands. After graduation from high school, he studied at the CIOS, a sports training school, but stopped his training to focus more on a singing and acting career, as well as briefly modeling. In 2007, he took part in So You Wanna Be a Popstar finishing fifth overall. At the end of 2007, he recorded his debut single "Wil je bij me blijven slapen op" that reached No. 18 on the Single Top 100.

Signing with Roadstar Agency in February 2008, in April 2009, released his second single "Ga", written by Joost Griffioen and Ray Klaassen (The Rocketeers). In late 2009, Tim landed a small role as Melle in the film De Hel van '63, directed by Steven de Jong.

In early 2010 he released his latest single "Je bent de hemel", a Dutch adaptation of the Spanish song "Yo No Sé Mañana" by the Nicaraguan singer Luis Enrique. In February 2010 he presented Tim op Tilt on Sterren 24 (sterren.nl), a specialty internet channel. He hosted the 2010 Sterren Awards with Monique Smit and Kees Tol. Tim op Tilt continued on Sterren until the closure of the station in September 2012. Tim also hosted the Karaoke Kids show on Z@pp.

In January 2011, he took part in Sterren Dansen op het IJs (Dancing Stars on Ice), but was eliminated in first round.

In January 2012, his song "Undercover Lover" was one of 6 finalists for Dutch entry for Eurovision Song Contest. It was eliminated in the first round when competing against a song from Pearl Jozefzoon, a contestant from first season of The Voice of Holland. "Undercover Lover" reached at No. 95 in the Dutch Single Top 100.

In December 2012, it was announced that Douwsma would release a joint album with Monique Smit in early 2013 and tour in the Netherlands and Belgium.

Douwsma is appeared in series 5 of the Dutch reality television program De beste zangers van Nederland in February 2013.

In May 2014, Douwsma was the spokesperson for The Netherlands in the Eurovision Song Contest, announcing the results of the country's public and jury votes.

Discography

Singles
2008: "Wil je bij me blijven slapen"
2010: "Je bent de hemel"
2010: "Allebei"
2010: "Winter voor twee"
2011: "Eén zomeravond met jou" (with Monique Smit)
2012: "Undercover Lover"
2014: "Lisa"
2019: "Fryslân"

Filmography
2007: Onderweg naar morgen (in 9 episodes as voice of Bink Broome)
2009: De Hel van '63 (English title The Hell of '63) as Melle
2017: Spaak as Luuk Meijer

References

External links

1987 births
Living people
People from Drachten
Popstars contestants
21st-century Dutch male singers
21st-century Dutch singers
Dutch male models
Nationaal Songfestival contestants